Gheorghe Amihalachioaie (born June 1, 1949, Molniţa) is a Moldovan lawyer and politician who served as member of the Parliament of Moldova from 1990 to 1994, a signatory of the Declaration of Independence of the Republic of Moldova.

In 1996 he was elected President of the Bar Association, and in 1999 he was president of the Union of Lawyers in Moldova. Since 2002 he has been chairman of the Bar Council of the Republic of Moldova.

In 2004 he became vice-president of the Centrist Union of Moldova.

After the elections of 29 July 2009, he left the Centrist Union and, together with about 40 MPs from the first Parliament (1990-1994), joined the Liberal Democratic Party of Moldova. He is known for defending his own case at the ECHR, which, on April 20, 2004, won him the case in the "Amihalachioaie v. Republic of Moldova" file after the Constitutional Court of the Republic of Moldova decided the imposition of a fine because he has made public his critical position towards a court ruling.

References

External links 
 Amihalachioaie Gheorghe
 Baroul Avocatilor din Republica Moldova
 Declaraţia deputaţilor din primul Parlament

1949 births
Living people
People from Chernivtsi Oblast
Moldova State University alumni
Moldovan jurists
Moldovan MPs 1990–1994
Popular Front of Moldova MPs
Recipients of the Order of Honour (Moldova)